John Lewis Rhodes is a mathematician known for work in the theory of semigroups, finite state automata, and algebraic approaches to differential equations.

Education and career
Rhodes was born in Columbus, Ohio, on July 16, 1937, but grew up in Wooster, Ohio, where he founded the Wooster Rocket Society as a teenager.  In the fall of 1955, Rhodes entered Massachusetts Institute of Technology intending to major in physics, but he soon switched to mathematics, earning his B.S. in 1960 and his Ph.D. in 1962.  His Ph.D. thesis, co-written with a graduate student from Harvard, Kenneth Krohn, became known as the Prime Decomposition Theorem, or more simply Krohn–Rhodes theory.  After a year on an NSF fellowship in Paris, France, he became a member of the Faculty of Mathematics at the University of California, Berkeley, where he spent his entire teaching career.

In the late 1960s Rhodes wrote Applications of Automata Theory and Algebra: Via the Mathematical Theory of Complexity to Biology, Physics, Psychology, Philosophy, and Games, informally known as The Wild Book, which quickly became an underground classic, but remained in typescript until its revision and editing by Chrystopher L. Nehaniv in 2009. The following year Springer Monographs in Mathematics published his and Benjamin Steinberg's magnum opus, The q-theory of Finite Semigroups, a compendium of the history of the field, but more importantly the fruit of eight years' development of finite semigroup theory.

In recent years Rhodes has expanded his research, bringing the insights of semigroups into matroid theory. In 2015 he published, with Pedro V. Silva, the results of his current work in another monograph with Springer: Boolean Representations of Simplicial Complexes and Matroids.

Books and Monographs 
  John Rhodes and Benjamin Steinberg (2008-12-17). The q-theory of finite semigroups. Springer Verlag. .
  "The Wild Book", published as Applications of Automata Theory and Algebra via the Mathematical Theory of Complexity to Biology, Physics, Psychology, Philosophy, and Games. John Rhodes. Chrystopher L. Nehaniv (Ed.). Foreword by Morris W. Hirsch. (2009, World Scientific Books.) 
   John Rhodes and Pedro V. Silva (2015-04). Boolean Representations of Simplicial Complexes and Matroids. Springer Verlag.

See also 
 Krohn–Rhodes theory

References

External links 
 Academic homepage
 Personal homepage
 Springer Monographs download page: q-Theory of Finite Semigroups
 Review of Applications of Automata Theory by Attila Egri-Nagy
 Springer Monographs download page: Boolean Representations of Simplicial Complexes

1937 births
Living people
20th-century American mathematicians
21st-century American mathematicians
People from Wooster, Ohio
Massachusetts Institute of Technology School of Science alumni
University of California, Berkeley College of Letters and Science faculty
Mathematicians from Ohio